Tommy is a statue of a First World War soldier by artist Ray Lonsdale, displayed close to Seaham war memorial, on Terrace Green by the seafront in Seaham, County Durham, in North East England.

It depicts a First World War soldier, wearing boots, puttees, greatcoat and tin hat, sitting on an ammunition box, with downcast eyes, holding the barrel of his grounded rifle in his right hand. It is officially named 1101 (or Eleven-O-One), referring to the first minute of peace as the armistice came into force at 11am on 11 November 1918, but is more popularly known as Tommy, referring to the archetype private soldier Tommy Atkins.

It was displayed temporarily in Seaham from May 2014, but became a permanent fixture after a committee of local residents raised £102,000 needed to buy it.  The price was handed over on 4 August 2014, the centenary of the outbreak of the First World War.   The statue was relocated onto a paved platform in 2015, under which was buried a time capsule containing donated items, including a letter from Ray Lonsdale, a T-shirt, children's artworks, war remembrances, and a Victory Medal.

The word Tommy can also refer to any other statue representing a First World War soldier, usually made of bronze, steel or concrete.

See also 
Freddie Gilroy and the Belsen Stragglers, a statue of a Second World War soldier by Ray Lonsdale, installed at Scarborough in 2011

References
 Seaham Tommy 1101: Town raises funds to buy sculpture, BBC News, 26 July 2014
 Sculptor Ray Lonsdale reveals the story behind the Tommy statue at Seaham, The Journal, 4 July 2014
 First World War hero Tommy is at Seaham to stay, Sunderland Echo, 27 May 2015

2014 sculptures
Outdoor sculptures in England
Steel sculptures in England
Weathering steel
World War I in popular culture
Seaham